Jones Branch is a stream in Shelby County in the U.S. state of Missouri. It is a tributary of South Fabius River.

Jones Branch has the name of the local Jones family.

See also
List of rivers of Missouri

References

Rivers of Shelby County, Missouri
Rivers of Missouri